Jean-Christophe Vergerolle (born 12 July 1985 in Paris, Île-de-France) is a French footballer currently playing for Belgian club Deinze.

Vergerolle signed for Arles from En Avant Guingamp on 20 July 2009 and was released in the end of November. He had a trial with Levski Sofia but it was ended. In July 2011 Vergerolle signed for Belgian Second Division outfit Royal Charleroi. On 31 January 2013 he signed for FC Brussels where he stayed until the team dissolved in the summer of 2014. As a free player he moved to Mons.

In 2019 he moved to Saint-Louis Neuweg.

References

External links
Jean-Christophe Vergerolle profile at foot-national.com

1985 births
Living people
Footballers from Paris
French footballers
French people of Martiniquais descent
Association football defenders
RC Strasbourg Alsace players
En Avant Guingamp players
AC Arlésien players
R. Charleroi S.C. players
R.W.D.M. Brussels F.C. players
R.A.E.C. Mons players
K.M.S.K. Deinze players
Ligue 1 players
Ligue 2 players
Belgian Pro League players
Challenger Pro League players